The 2002 Voyageurs Cup was the inaugural Voyageurs Cup tournament which was started by the Canadian supporters group The Voyageurs. The 2002 Edition of the tournament saw four participating teams: Calgary Storm, Montreal Impact, Toronto Lynx and Vancouver Whitecaps.

The 2002 competition was dominated by the Toronto Lynx and Montreal Impact. Calgary was not competitive in the competition, and Vancouver lost two close games in July to Toronto and Montreal putting them too far behind the two frontrunners. Toronto led the competition with thirteen of a possible fifteen points after five of their six games. In Toronto's last game at home against Montreal Impact, they only need a draw to win the first Voyageurs Cup. Montreal, however, jumped out to an early 0–2 lead after seven minutes and held on for the win. Montreal Impact won their last three games of the competition, including 1–2 over Toronto, to overcome Toronto's lead and win the augural competition.

Format

Each team played two matches (home and away) against each other team. All of these matches are drawn from the USL A-league's 2002 regular season; the final match played between each pair of teams in each city is counted as a Voyageurs Cup 2002 match.  In each match, 3 points are awarded for wins (even if it comes in extra time), 1 point is awarded for a draw, and 0 points are awarded for losses (even if it comes in extra time).  There are no bonus points awarded as there are in the A-league.  In 2002 the A-League points system was 4 points for a win, 1 point for a draw, 0 points for a loss + 1 bonus point when scoring three or more goals in a game.  The four teams are ranked according to the total number of points obtained in all Voyageurs Cup 2002 matches.

The team ranked highest after all matches have been played is the champion, and will be awarded the Voyageurs Cup.

Tiebreakers
If two or more teams are tied on points then they are ranked relative to each other by applying the following tiebreakers:

 Number of points obtained in the Voyageurs Cup 2002 matches between the tied teams.
 Goal difference in the Voyageurs Cup 2002 matches between the tied teams.
 Number of goals scored in the Voyageurs Cup 2002 matches between the tied teams.
 Number of away goals scored in the Voyageurs Cup 2002 matches between the tied teams.
 Goal difference in all Voyageurs Cup 2002 matches.
 Number of goals scored in all Voyageurs Cup 2002 matches.
 Number of away goals scored in all Voyageurs Cup 2002 matches.
 If exactly two teams are tied: Number of points obtained in all A-league 2002 regular season matches between the tied teams using the Voyageurs Cup 2002 point-scoring system.
 If exactly two teams are tied: Goal difference in all A-league 2002 regular season matches between the tied teams.
 If exactly two teams are tied: Number of away goals scored in all A-league 2002 regular season matches between the tied teams.
 Number of points obtained in all A-league 2002 regular season matches using the A-league 2002 point-scoring system (4 points for a win, 1 point for a draw, 0 points for a loss, 1 bonus point for each match in which 3 or more goals are scored).
 Goal difference in all A-league 2002 regular season matches.
 Number of goals scored in all A-league 2002 regular season matches.
 Number of away goals scored in all A-league 2002 regular season matches.
 Stage reached in the A-league 2002 playoffs.
 Goal difference in the furthest A-league 2002 playoff stage reached.
 Number of goals scored in the furthest A-league 2002 playoff stage reached.
 Number of away goals scored in the furthest A-league 2002 playoff stage reached.

Standings

Results by round

Schedule

Champion

Top scorers

References

2002
2002 domestic association football cups
2002 in Canadian soccer